"Inside Out" is a song by British singer and songwriter Shara Nelson, released in November 1993 on Cooltempo Records as the third single from her first solo album, What Silence Knows (1993). In August 1994, it was re-released as part of a remix single with "Down That Road". A music video was produced to promote the single.

Critical reception
In his weekly UK chart commentary, James Masterton wrote, "Easily the most outstanding track from her album, "Inside Out" goes back to basics featuring just her voice accompanied by a pedal steel guitar, both swathed in echo as if playing in an empty hall. The result is the most heartbreakingly beautiful record you are likely to hear all year and tragically this may be as far as it gets." Upon the re-release of the single, a reviewer from Music & Media said, "A re-release, so here's a re-run of our view: upside down, inside out, backwards, whatever; as long as you play this "electricoustic" soul ballad you stay on the right side of programming." Andy Beevers from Music Week gave it four out of five and named it "one of the classiest tracks" on the album. He noted that it has been remixed for the single by Frankie Knuckles, "who has fleshed out the sparse production of the original to create a lush downtempo soul shuffler". Beevers concluded with that "it should make hit number three." Jonathan Bernstein from Spin felt that "all embellishments are jettisoned for the voice-and-guitar" track.

Track listings
 UK CD single
 "Inside Out" (Album Mix) 3:24
 "Inside Out" (Rhythm Vocal Mix) 3:36
 "Inside Out" (Classic Club Mix) 7:04
 "Inside Out" (Underdog Mix) 6:08

 UK CD1 (1994 remix)
 "Inside Out" (Album Mix) 3:28
 "Inside Out" (Orchestral Version) 4:16
 "Down That Road" (Def Classic Mix) 7:14
 "Inside Out" (Rhythm Vocal Version) 3:36

 UK CD2 (1994 remix)
 "Inside Out" (Frankie Knuckles Classic Mix) 6:42
 "Down That Road" (Morales Edit) 3:36
 "One Goodbye in Ten" (7" Edit) 4:11
 "Uptight" (Delta House Of Funk Reconstruction) 5:59

Charts

Release history

References

External links
 

1993 songs
1994 singles
Cooltempo Records singles
Shara Nelson songs
Songs written by Shara Nelson